Hamedanak Rural District is in Bostan District of Baharestan County, Tehran province, Iran. At the National Census of 2006, its population (as a part of Robat Karim County) was 32,894 in 7,780 households. There were 41,063 inhabitants in 11,124 households at the following census of 2011, by which time the district, together with Golestan District, had been separated from the county and Baharestan County established. At the most recent census of 2016, the population of the rural district was 29,210 in 8,523 households. The largest of its 3 villages was Ovrin, with 17,577 people. Hamedanak and Kheyrabad-e Pain had populations of 11,216 and 417, respectively.

References 

Baharestan County

Rural Districts of Tehran Province

Populated places in Tehran Province

Populated places in Baharestan County